A special election was held in the U.S. state of Minnesota on February 4, 2020, to elect a new member for District 60A in the Minnesota House of Representatives, caused by the death of Democratic–Farmer–Labor (DFL) member Diane Loeffler. A primary election was held on January 21, 2020, to nominate a DFL candidate. Sydney Jordan, the DFL nominee, won the special election.

Background
On November 16, 2019, District 60A 15-year incumbent Diane Loeffler died of cancer. On November 27, 2019, Governor Tim Walz announced the date of the primary and special elections. Walz chose the date of the primary election to accommodate the large student population in the district, while still taking place before the February 11 reconvening of the 91st Minnesota Legislature.

District 60A is located in Hennepin County, representing northeast Minneapolis. Loeffler first represented the area when it was District 59A after winning election in 2004, succeeding fellow DFL member Len Biernat, who did not seek re-election. In the last election in 2018, Loeffler won with 86 percent of the vote.

Candidates
The candidate filing period was from December 3 to December 10, 2019.

Minnesota Democratic–Farmer–Labor Party
 Mohamed Barre, employee for the Hennepin County Health and Human Services Department
 Piyali Nath Dalal, writer
 Amal Ibrahim, interpreter
 Jessica Intermill, attorney
 Sydney Jordan, state director of Save the Boundary Waters
 Sonia Neculescu, political action director of Women for Political Change
 Aaron Neumann, real estate broker; former aide for then-U.S. Representative Keith Ellison
 Aswar Rahman, social media director for U.S. Senator Amy Klobuchar's 2020 presidential campaign; candidate for mayor of Minneapolis in 2017
 Saciido Shaie, cofounder and executive director of the Ummah Project
 Zachary Wefel, attorney
 Susan Whitaker, human resources employee for Hennepin County

Legal Marijuana Now Party
 Marty Super, candidate for the Minnesota Senate in District 60 in 2016

Primary election
The area represented by District 60A has in recent decades voted overwhelmingly for DFL candidates. The winner of the DFL nomination would likely be the winner of the special election.

Results

Results

See also
 2020 Minnesota House of Representatives District 30A special election
 List of special elections to the Minnesota House of Representatives

References

External links
 Elections & Voting - Minnesota Secretary of State
 District 60A special election - Minnesota Secretary of State 

Official campaign websites
Aaron Neumann (DFL) for MN House 60A
Sydney Jordan (DFL) for Minnesota House
Zachary Weifel (DFL) for MN State House
People for Piyali Dalal (DFL), House 60A
Amal Ibrahim (DFL) for MN House 60A
Neighbors for Sonia Neculescu (DFL)
Susan Whitaker (DFL) for State Representative 
Jessica Intermill for Eastside (DFL)
Aswar Rahman for State Representative (DFL)

2020 Minnesota elections
Minnesota special elections